The New Zealand cricket team toured India in November and December 2021 to play two Test and three Twenty20 International (T20I) matches. The Test matches formed part of the 2021–2023 ICC World Test Championship. In September 2021, the Board of Control for Cricket in India (BCCI) confirmed the schedule for the tour.

Prior to the 2021 ICC Men's T20 World Cup, Virat Kohli announced that he would be stepping down as the captain of India's T20I team following the conclusion of the tournament. In November 2021, the BCCI named Rohit Sharma as India's T20I captain for the matches against New Zealand. Ajinkya Rahane was named as India's captain for the first Test, with Virat Kohli joining the team to captain the side for the second Test. Before the start of the T20I series, New Zealand Cricket announced that Kane Williamson would miss the T20I matches to focus on his preparation for the Test matches, with Tim Southee named as captain in his absence. Williamson also missed the second Test, due to an injury, with Tom Latham named as New Zealand's captain for the match.

India won the first T20I match by five wickets, and won the second match by seven wickets to win the series with a match to spare. India won the third T20I match by 73 runs to win the series 3–0. The first Test match was drawn, with India needing one wicket for victory before bad light stopped play late on the fifth and final day. With the draw, it extended New Zealand's undefeated record in Test cricket to ten consecutive matches, their longest streak in the format. In the second Test, New Zealand's Ajaz Patel became the third bowler to take all ten wickets in an innings in Test cricket, bowling India out for 325 runs. However, in reply New Zealand were bowled out for only 62 runs. India went on to win the match by 372 runs, winning the Test series 1–0.

Squads

Adam Milne was named as injury cover for New Zealand's T20I squad. Trent Boult and Colin de Grandhomme both opted out of New Zealand's Test squad, citing bubble fatigue. Devon Conway was ruled out of New Zealand's T20I and Test squads after breaking his hand during the semi-final match against England at the 2021 ICC Men's T20 World Cup. Daryl Mitchell was named as Conway's replacement in New Zealand's Test side. Kyle Jamieson opted out of New Zealand's T20I squad to focus on the Test matches. Following the T20I series, Suryakumar Yadav was added to India's Test squad, replacing KL Rahul, who was ruled out of the Test matches due to a muscle strain injury.

T20I series

1st T20I

2nd T20I

3rd T20I

Test series

1st Test

2nd Test

Notes

References

External links
 Series home at ESPN Cricinfo

2021 in Indian cricket
2021 in New Zealand cricket
International cricket competitions in 2021–22
New Zealand cricket tours of India